Peter Fitzgerald (born November 17, 1962, Orange County, California, USA) is an American actor who played a dancer in the 1985 musical film A Chorus Line.

External links

1962 births
Living people
American male film actors